Maurice M. Black (May 3, 1918 – September 14, 1996) was a pathologist who was an expert on breast cancer.

Biography
Black was born in Cleveland; he   received his bachelor's degree  from Long Island University (1938) and his medical degree in 1943 from New York Medical College (1943). During World War II, he was an officer in the Army Medical Corps and received the Silver Star and three battle stars

He   taught pathology from 1958 to 1990 at  New York Medical College in Valhalla, N.Y. He was the director of the Medical College's Institute for Breast Diseases for two decades and was subsequently affiliated with New York Methodist Hospital in Brooklyn. He published more than 250 studies.

Career
In 1953, he published with  Francis D. Speer a study in the New York State Journal of Medicine declaring that "ultraradical surgical attempts to cure breast cancer are not consistent with the biology of the disease."   He co-authored two books, Human Cancer (1957)  and Dynamic Pathology: Structural and Functional Mechanisms of Disease (1964).

References

External links 
Maurice M. Black, M.D. in memoriam. Zachrau RE. New York Medical College, Valhalla, USA. 
The New York Times. Kolata, Gina. Early Detection of Cancer: Nothing is Black and White. Published: December 24, 2002
Breast Cancer Wars : Hope, Fear, and the Pursuit of a Cure in Twentieth-Century America. Lerner, Barron H.  |  | Publication Date: May 31, 2001 | Edition: 1

1918 births
1996 deaths
American pathologists
Long Island University alumni
New York Medical College alumni
New York Medical College faculty
Scientists from New York (state)
United States Army personnel of World War II